The 1990 Copper Bowl featured the Wyoming Cowboys and the California Golden Bears.

After a scoreless first quarter, Cal quarterback Mike Pawlawski threw a 25-yard touchdown pass to Brian Treggs giving Cal a 7–0 lead. A 26-yard Wyoming field goal cut the margin to 7–3 at halftime. In the third quarter, Cal added a 46-yard field goal to take a 10–3 lead. In the fourth quarter, Eric Zomalt scored on a 4-yard touchdown run increasing Cal's lead to 17–3. Wyoming scored on an 11-yard Daffer run, and attempted a 2-point conversion that failed, to make the score 17–9. They later scored on a 70-yard punt return, but the 2-point conversion attempt again failed, leaving the final score 17–15.

Statistics 

Source:

References 

Copper Bowl
Guaranteed Rate Bowl
Wyoming Cowboys football bowl games
California Golden Bears football bowl games
Sports in Tucson, Arizona
Copper Bowl
December 1990 sports events in the United States
Events in Tucson, Arizona